The Pagoda (also known as the World War I Memorial or World War I Monument) is a memorial designed by Slack Winburn, installed in Salt Lake City's Memory Grove in the U.S. state of Utah. Built as the park's first memorial, using marble from Vermont, the classical structure has eight Doric columns. The shaft and urn were added in 1932.

References

External links

 

Buildings and structures in Salt Lake City
Monuments and memorials in Utah
Military monuments and memorials in the United States
World War I memorials in the United States